In algebraic geometry, Chow's moving lemma, proved by , states: given algebraic cycles Y, Z on a nonsingular quasi-projective variety X, there is another algebraic cycle Z'  on X such that Z'  is rationally equivalent to Z and Y and Z'  intersect properly. The lemma is one of key ingredients in developing the intersection theory, as it is used to show the uniqueness of the theory.

Even if Z is an effective cycle, it is not, in general, possible to choose the cycle Z'  to be effective.

References 

 
 

Theorems in algebraic geometry
Zhou, Weiliang